Spanish Springs is a census-designated place (CDP) in Washoe County, Nevada, United States. It is located in the northeastern part of the Reno–Sparks Metropolitan Statistical Area. The population was 15,064 at the 2010 Census.

Geography
Spanish Springs is located at  (39.658301, -119.695130).

History
Sky Ranch Airport, a -long dirt airstrip, was located northeast of the intersection of State Route 445 and Spanish Springs Road.  This 1940s auxiliary field was the site of the first Reno Air Races, in 1964 and 1965, then was the location of the headquarters of the  Rocketdyne Nevada Field Laboratory (NFL), which was used in the late 1960s and early 1970s for testing rocket engines used in the Space Program.

The Sky Ranch airfield site has been covered by housing developments, which are expanding in the area as the Reno-Sparks metropolitan area expands.

Now known as Spanish Springs Airport (N86), it has been in continuous operation since 1971.

Education 
As of 2013, the Washoe County School District is offering an elective course in the Paiute language at Spanish Springs High School. Washoe County is the first school district in Nevada to offer Paiute classes.

Spanish Springs has a public library, a branch of the Washoe County Library.

Demographics

As of the census of 2000, there were 9,018 people, 3,014 households, and 2,531 families residing in the CDP. The population density was 151.5 people per square mile (58.5/km). There were 3,078 housing units at an average density of 51.7 per square mile (20.0/km). The racial makeup of the CDP was 92.6% White, 0.7% African American, 1.2% Native American, 1.4% Asian, 0.1% Pacific Islander, 1.7% from other races, and 2.3% from two or more races. Hispanic or Latino of any race were 5.8% of the population.

There were 3,014 households, out of which 47.4% had children under the age of 18 living with them, 75.2% were married couples living together, 5.0% had a female householder with no husband present, and 16.0% were non-families. 9.6% of all households were made up of individuals, and 1.1% had someone living alone who was 65 years of age or older. The average household size was 2.99 and the average family size was 3.20.

In the CDP, the population was spread out, with 31.4% under the age of 18, 4.3% from 18 to 24, 36.9% from 25 to 44, 22.8% from 45 to 64, and 4.6% who were 65 years of age or older. The median age was 35 years. For every 100 females, there were 104.3 males. For every 100 females age 18 and over, there were 102.3 males.

The median income for a household in the CDP was $69,451, and the median income for a family was $72,026. Males had a median income of $46,711 versus $32,853 for females. The per capita income for the CDP was $26,908. About 2.2% of families and 3.5% of the population were below the poverty line, including 2.8% of those under age 18 and none of those age 65 or over.

Its population has increased to 15,064 per the 2010 census.

References

Information on Rocketdyne NFL cleanup

Census-designated places in Washoe County, Nevada
Census-designated places in Nevada
Reno, NV Metropolitan Statistical Area